Madeleine Ozeray (13 September 1908 in Bouillon – 28 March 1989 ), was a French stage and film actress. She appeared in many films between 1932 and 1980. She is the godmother of theater actor, dancer and singer Frédéric Norbert.

Biography
Madeleine Ozeray was born in Bouillon Belgium to Camille Ozeray (1855–1938), a lawyer and Liberal member of the province of Luxembourg, and Marie Deymann.

She studied at the Royal Conservatory of Brussels where she won first prize for comedy.

At twenty-seven she joined the theater company of Louis Jouvet where she played the role of Helen in The Trojan War Will Not Take Place by Jean Giraudoux at the Théâtre de l'Athénée. In 1939 she appeared opposite Jouvet in the film The End of the day produced by Julien Duvivier, in the role of young Jeannette.  She plays with such delicate grace characteristic, both fragile and fierce, she had already filled the role of Rosalie in the film Victor Trivas 1933, in the streets.

In April 1939 Jean Giraudoux's play Ondine opened in Paris with Ozeray in the title role.

In 2008, in celebration of the centenary of Ms. Ozeray's birth, Belgian journalist Dominique Zachary devoted an entire book, now the standard reference work, tracing the life and career of this celebrated actress.

Ms. Ozeray died in Paris at the age of 81 after a long battle with cancer. She is buried in the cemetery of her hometown of Bouillon.

Partial filmography 

1932:  (directed by Fred Ellis and Max Neufeld) - Magda
1933: Un peu d'amour (directed by Hans Steinhoff) - Miette
1933: La dame de chez Maxim's (directed by Alexander Korda) - Clémentine
1933: On the Streets (directed by Victor Trivas) - Rosalie - la fille du père Schlamp
1933: Knock ou le triomphe de la médecine (directed by Louis Jouvet and Roger Goupillières) - Mariette
1933: La Guerre des valses (directed by Raoul Ploquin and Ludwig Berger) - Queen Victoria
1934: Casanova (directed by René Barberis) - Angelica
1934: Liliom (directed by Fritz Lang) - Julie Boulard / Liliom and Julie's daughter
1934: The House on the Dune (directed by Pierre Billon) - Pascaline
1934: Bar de nuit (Short)
1935: Le secret des Woronzeff (directed by André Beucler and Arthur Robison) - Nadia
1935: Crime et Châtiment (directed by Pierre Chenal) - Sonia
1935: Les Mystères de Paris (directed by Félix Gandéra) - Fleur-de-Marie
1935: Sous la griffe (directed by Christian-Jaque) - Pierrette
1936: Le Coupable (directed by Raymond Bernard) - Thérèse Forgeat
1937: La Dame de pique (directed by Fedor Ozep) - Lisa
1938: Ramuntcho (directed by René Barberis) - Gracieuse
1939: La Fin du jour (directed by Julien Duvivier) - Jeannette
1940: L'école des femmes (directed by Max Ophüls)
1945: The Music Master (Le Père Chopin) (directed by Fedor Ozep) - Madeleine Dupont
1973: Les Anges (directed by Jean Desvilles) - Lili
1974: La Pousse des feuilles (Short, directed by Francis Ramirez and Christian Rolot)
1974: La Race des seigneurs (directed by Pierre Granier-Deferre)
1975: Le Vieux Fusil (directed by Robert Enrico) - Julien's Mother
1978: M, cinquante huit (Short, directed by Jean-Claude Boussard)
1980: Chère inconnue (directed by Moshé Mizrahi) - Madame Thomas

Theatre 

1926: Au grand large, Hunt Sutton Vane; Comedie des Champs-Elysees
1933: Cette nuit là..., Lajos Zilahy, Théâtre de la Madeleine
1933: Mandarine, Jean Anouilh, Théâtre de l'Athénée
1934: Au grand large, Hunt Sutton Vane; Comedie des Champs-Elysees
1934: Tessa, la nymphe au cœur fidèle, Jean Giraudoux; Théâtre de l'Athénée
1935: La guerre de Troie n'aura pas lieu, Jean Giraudoux, Théâtre de l'Athénée
1936: L'École des femmes, Molière, Théâtre de l'Athénée
1937: Électre, Jean Giraudoux, Théâtre de l'Athénée
1937: L'Impromptu de Paris, Jean Giraudoux, Théâtre de l'Athénée
1938: Le Corsaire, Marcel Achard, Théâtre de l'Athénée
1939: Ondine, Jean Giraudoux, Théâtre de l'Athénée
1941: L'Occasion, Prosper Mérimée, Latin American tour
1942: On ne badine pas avec l'amour, 'Alfred de Musset, Latin American tour
1942: L'Apollon de Marsac, Jean Giraudoux, Latin American tour
1942: La Belle au bois, Jules Supervielle, Latin American tour
1942: L'Annonce faite à Marie, Paul Claudel, Latin American tour
1953: Le Chemin de crête, Gabriel Marcel, Theatre du Vieux-Colombier
1957: Au Paradis, Fernand Millaud, Théâtre des Arts
1959: La guerre de Troie n'aura pas lieu, Jean Giraudoux, Bellac Festival
1965: La Folle de Chaillot, Jean Giraudoux, Théâtre national de Chaillot
1971: La Folle de Chaillot, Jean Giraudoux, Bellac Festival
1971: Oscarine ou les tournesols, Liliane Wouters, Théâtre Daniel Sorano,
1973: Par-dessus bord, Michel Vinaver, Théâtre de l'Odéon
1976: Le Genre humain, Jean-Edern Hallier, Espace Cardin

References

External links
 Madeleine Ozeray at Virtual History
 
 Madeleine Ozeray in Charmant duel

1908 births
1989 deaths
People from Bouillon
French film actresses
French stage actresses
20th-century French actresses